TCF Bank was the wholly owned banking subsidiary of TCF Financial Corporation, a bank holding company headquartered in Detroit. As of August 10, 2020, TCF Bank had approximately 475 branches in Minnesota, Illinois, Michigan, Colorado, Wisconsin, Ohio, and South Dakota.

History

TCF Bank began business in 1923 as Twin City Building and Loan Association.  It received a federal charter in 1936 and changed its name to Twin City Federal Savings and Loan Association. The company went public in 1986 chartered under the name TCF Banking and Savings, F.A. (TCF Bank).  Until 2019, despite some bank acquisitions such as Great Lakes Bancorp and Standard Financial, TCF Bank grew primarily through de novo expansion.

On January 28, 2019, Detroit-based Chemical Bank announced it would merge with TCF Bank. The new corporation will retain the TCF name, but be headquartered in the new TCF Tower the combined company is constructing in Detroit.  In addition to its headquarters in Detroit, the bank will maintain large operating centers in Minneapolis, Minnesota, and Midland, Michigan.  On August 5, 2019, the merger was completed creating the new TCF Bank.

On December 13, 2020, TCF management announced an all-stock merger with Columbus, Ohio-based Huntington Bancshares.  Under the terms of the merger agreement, the bank will retain the Huntington name and have headquarters in both Columbus, for retail operations, and Detroit for business operations. TCF shareholders will receive 3.0028 HBAN shares for each share of TCF. TCF's stock reacted positively to the news, trading up ~7% at the market open on the Monday following the announcement. On May 26, 2021, the Department of Justice mandated that TCF Bank sell 13 branches in Michigan.  Horizon Bank purchased these branches in September 2021. Regulators gave final approval for the merger and it closed on June 9, 2021.

Locations

Minnesota
TCF Bank was founded in Minneapolis. With approximately 110 branches in the area, it continues to be a major force in the Twin Cities. In-store branches are located inside of Cub Foods stores. Its previous headquarters were in Wayzata, Minnesota, but now has larger operation centers in Plymouth and Minnetonka.

TCF Bank operates campus branches in partnership with the University of Minnesota (including the Duluth campus).

Illinois
TCF Bank operated 148 locations in the Chicago metropolitan area, including branches located inside Jewel-Osco stores.  It closed 37 branches in 2013 and another 33 in 2016.  In some locations, it replaced the full-service branches with ATMs.
Also, as of March 2019 other than a few select ones the majority of the Jewel/Osco TCF Bank branches inside the stores are now closed on Sunday

Wisconsin

TCF Bank operates 16 branches in Wisconsin. These are located in the metro Milwaukee, Racine and Kenosha areas.

Michigan

TCF Bank operates approximately 130 branches throughout Michigan, including approximately 90 former Chemical Bank branches.

In 1995, TCF increased its Michigan presence by acquiring the Great Lakes National Bank. From 1995 through 1998, the TCF Bank branches in Michigan operated under the Great Lakes National Bank name. In 1999, all of the branches were reflagged as TCF.

In 2002, the University of Michigan announced that TCF Bank had been selected as a preferred provider of banking services to students, faculty, and staff.  The University terminated this agreement in 2015.

In 2005, TCF Bank announced the sale of its Michigan headquarters building to Ann Arbor real-estate company McKinley Associates, though part of the ground level remains a TCF Bank branch.

On November 6, 2006, TCF announced the sale of 10 branches in Battle Creek, Bay City, and Saginaw to Independent Bank. With this sale, TCF's Michigan branches became concentrated in Southeast Michigan, primarily in and around metropolitan Detroit.

Colorado
TCF has 36 branches in the Denver metro area and Colorado Springs.

Ohio
TCF has approximately 24 branches in the greater Cleveland area and the greater Mahoning valley, which were previously Chemical Bank locations.

Arizona
TCF's first branch office was opened in Mesa, on December 13, 2006. TCF operated seven branches in the state of Arizona.  However, in early 2020, TCF completed the sale of all seven branches to Alaska USA Federal Credit Union.

South Dakota
TCF has 2 branches in Sioux Falls.

Controversies

Overdraft fees
In 2010, TCF Bank was sued regarding overdraft charges. Some practices that came to light included processing higher amount transactions first in order to drain customer accounts faster, allowing TCF to then increase the number of total overdraft charges from each of the smaller amounts remaining, as well as charging overdraft fees on a daily basis rather than posing one flat fee. In 2011, TCF Bank changed its overdraft policy to include a daily $28 fee. After public backlash, the bank reversed its policy in 2012.

Bank Secrecy Act
In January 2013, the Comptroller of the Currency assessed a $10 million fine on TCF for violating the Bank Secrecy Act. This was a result of the bank's failure to file suspicious activity reports in a timely fashion.

Civil Suit for Discrimination
On January 21, 2020, an assistant manager at a TCF branch on Middlebelt Road in Livonia, Michigan, called police when Sauntore Thomas, an African-American account holder, attempted to deposit checks received as a settlement in a racial discrimination lawsuit. The branch manager was unable to validate the checks and claimed they were fraudulent. TCF also filed a police report for fraud against the customer despite verification from his attorney that the checks were genuine. Thomas filed a suit on January 22, 2020, seeking unspecified damages from the bank. On January 23, 2020, TCF issued an apology stating that local police should not have been involved; explaining that they take extra precautions involving large deposits and requests for cash.

Naming rights

On March 24, 2005, TCF Bank and the University of Minnesota announced that the bank would contribute $35 million during a 25-year period toward a proposed on-campus outdoor football stadium, in exchange for naming rights. The original agreement contained an expiration date of December 31, 2005, but both parties agreed to extend it to June 30, 2006, to allow the legislature to provide additional funding. Governor Tim Pawlenty signed the bill authorizing the stadium on May 24, 2006, and the stadium officially opened its doors for the inaugural Gopher football game of the 2009 season, held on September 12, 2009. 

As a result of the December 2020 merger of TCF with Huntington, the facility's name changed.

 
On February 20, 2019, the Detroit Regional Convention Facility Authority (DRCFA) awarded venue naming rights for Cobo Hall to Chemical Bank under a 22-year agreement. After Chemical completed its merger with TCF in August, DRCFA and bank officials announced the facility would be known as TCF Center.  As a result of the December 2020 merger of TCF with Huntington, the facility was renamed Huntington Place on December 9, 2021.

References

External links
Official website (Archive)

Huntington Bancshares
Banks based in Minnesota
Wayzata, Minnesota
Defunct banks of the United States
Economy of the Midwestern United States
Economy of the Southwestern United States
1923 establishments in Minnesota
Banks established in 1923
Banks disestablished in 2021
American corporate subsidiaries
2021 mergers and acquisitions